The 2008 Liga de Fútbol Profesional Boliviano was the 32nd season of Bolivia's top-flight professional football league. The season was split into two championships: the Apertura and the Clausura.

Teams and venues

Torneo Apertura
The 2008 Campeonato Apertura Entel was the first championship of the season. It began on February 23 and ended on July 20.

Top goalscorers

Torneo Clausura
The 2008 Campeonato Clausura Entel was the second championship of the season. It began on August 3 and ended on November 3.

First phase

Serie A

Serie B

Second phase

First leg

Second leg

Final phase
The finals was a best-of-three series.

Game 1

Blooming is ahead 1–0.

Game 2

Series tied 1–1.

Game 3

Aurora won 2–1.

Aurora qualified for 2009 Copa Libertadores Second Stage.
Blooming qualified for 2009 Copa Sudamericana First Stage.

Torneo Play Off

First round

As the four best losers, Oriente Petrolero, San José, Aurora, and The Strongest qualified to the Losers Round.

Losers Round

Semifinals

Final

San José qualified for the semifinals as the best loser.

Quarterfinals

Semifinals

Finals

First leg

Second leg

Real Potosi wins 2–0 on aggregate. Real Potosi qualified for the First Stage of the 2009 Copa Libertadores.

Relegation
The team with the worst average will be relegated to the Regional Leagues. The second-worst team will play a promotion/relegation playoff against the runner-up of the Regional Leagues.

Promotion/relegation playoff
First leg

Second leg

''Real Mamoré won 4–2 on aggregate. Real Mamoré remains in the LFPB for 2009.

External links
Season regulations 
Soccerway Page
RSSSF Page

Bolivian Primera División seasons
Bolivia
1